José de Jesús María Fajardo, O.A.D. (1643–1694) was a Roman Catholic prelate who served as Bishop of Alghero (1693–1694).

Biography
Jesús María Fajardo was born in Madrid, Spain on 18 Mar 1643 and ordained a priest in the Ordo Augustiniensium Discalceatorum.
On 18 May 1693, he was appointed during the papacy of Pope Innocent XII as Bishop of Alghero.
On 19 Jul 1693, he was consecrated bishop by Luis Manuel Fernández de Portocarrero-Bocanegra y Moscoso-Osorio, Archbishop of Toledo, with Francisco Zapata Vera y Morales, Titular Bishop of Dara, and Luis de Lemos y Usategui, Bishop Emeritus of Concepción, serving as co-consecrators. 
He served as Bishop of Alghero until his death on 13 Apr 1694.

References 

17th-century Roman Catholic bishops in Spain
Bishops appointed by Pope Innocent XII
1643 births
1694 deaths
People from Madrid
Discalced Augustinian bishops